Class H is a type of electric multiple unit train used on the Berlin U-Bahn, Berlin's underground rapid transit system. They were the first new design of wide profile trains introduced after the fall of the Berlin Wall and have been in use since 1996. It is the first model to allow passengers to freely walk through the entire length of the train, as opposed to having multiple closed off compartments.

History
After the reunification of Germany, the Berliner Verkehrsbetriebe (BVG) saw an urgent need for more trains, as well as a new, more uniform model for both the East and the West to use. Thus, in order to replace the D, DL and E classes, they placed an order of 115 new trains in 1992, which was later reduced to 26, with 20 more to be delivered at a later time. The first test runs of the new trains were held from 1996 before serial delivery began in 1997.

Features
Unlike other wide profile trains, the H class trains only feature longitudinal seats, a feature usually found in small profile trains. It was also the first model introduced in Berlin to feature open gangways, allowing for free movement through the whole length of the train. The interior colours are mainly white and yellow.

The BVG Class H trains were the first trains in the Berlin U-Bahn subway system to have the automatic next station announcement system and visual next station information led bar display. The interior advertisement lcd displays were installed in the 2000s. Since the 2010s, the left of the two screens show next station information. That feature was eventually installed in the rest of the Berlin U-Bahn subway fleet except for the BVG Class HK trains.

Each of the batches of H class trains delivered received its own name, with the prototypes being referred to as H95 and the versions of the two later, serial deliveries as H97 and H01 respectively. All individual trains also received a serial number in the format of 5xxx. They were ordered from and manufactured by Adtranz, ABB Henschel and Bombardier.

References

Berlin U-Bahn
Electric multiple units of Germany
750 V DC multiple units
Bombardier Transportation multiple units